"Gee Baby" is a song originally released by the duo Joe & Ann.   It was co-written by Joe Joseph and Alvin Tyler, arranged and produced by Tyler, and recorded in New Orleans, possibly with Mac Rebennack (Dr. John) on keyboards.  Released as a single in 1959, it peaked at no. 14 on U.S. Billboard's R'n'B chart, called Hot R&B Sides at the time.

Track listings 
7" single Ace Records 577 (1959, US)
A. "Wherever You May Be" (2:20)
B. "Gee Baby" (2:19)

7" single Black Swan WI-468 (1959, UK)
A. "Gee Baby" (2:19)
B. "Wherever You May Be" (2:20)

Charts

Mickey & Sylvia version 

In 1961 the song was covered, under the title "Baby You're So Fine", by another duo, Mickey & Sylvia. Their version reached no. 26 on Billboard's R&B chart and no. 52 on the Billboard Hot 100.

Charts

Sylvie Vartan version (in French) 

The song was later reworked into French under the title "Tous les gens". It was recorded by Sylvie Vartan and released in 1963 on an EP. In France her version of the song spent two consecutive weeks on the singles sales chart (from 30 March to 12 April 1963).

Track listing 
EP Sylvie ("Chance" / "Il revient" / "Reponds-moi" / "Tous les gens") RCA Victor 76.617 (1963, France)
 A1. "Chance" ("Chains")
 A2. "Il revient" ("Say Mama")
 B1. "Reponds-moi"
 B2. "Tous les gens" ("Baby You’re So Fine")

Charts

Other covers 
In 1966 the original song (in English) was covered, under the title "Baby You're So Fine", by The Inn Crowd.

References 

Sylvie Vartan songs
Mickey & Sylvia songs
1959 songs
1960 singles
1961 singles
1963 singles
Songs written by Sylvia Robinson
Ace Records (United States) singles
RCA Victor singles